Salt is the first album by singer and composer Lizz Wright, released in 2003 on Verve Records. The album reached No. 2 on the Billboard Top Contemporary Jazz chart and No. 4 on the Billboard Top Jazz Albums chart.

Track listing
"Open Your Eyes, You Can Fly" (Chick Corea, Neville Potter) – 5:07 
"Salt" (Lizz Wright) – 3:25 
"Afro Blue" (Mongo Santamaria, Oscar Brown Jr.) – 5:51 
"Soon as I Get Home" (Charlie Smalls) – 4:26 
"Walk with Me, Lord" (traditional) – 4:06 
"Eternity" (Wright) – 3:35 
"Goodbye" (Gordon Jenkins) – 3:57 
"Vocalise/End of the Line" (Sergey Rachmaninoff/Cynthia Medley, John Edmonson) – 4:33 
"Fire" (Wright) – 4:15 
"Blue Rose" (Kenny Banks, Wright) – 4:06 
"Lead the Way" (Brian Blade) – 4:23 
"Silence" (Wright) – 2:42

Personnel
Lizz Wright – vocals
Jon Cowherd – piano (tracks 4, 6, 8, 9, 11), Fender Rhodes (4, 7, 10, 11), arrangement (1, 6–10), horn arrangement (2)
Kenneth Banks – Fender Rhodes (1, 3), Hammond organ (2, 5, 9), piano (2, 10), arrangement (5, 10)
John Hart - guitar (1–7, 9, 11), acoustic guitar (8, 10), arrangement (9)
Doug Weiss – bass (exc. 12), arrangement (9)
Brian Blade – drums (1, 4–11), acoustic guitar (12), arrangement (3, 7, 9, 12)
Jeff Haynes – percussion (1, 3–9, 11)
plus
Sam Yahel – Hammond organ (1)
Danilo Pérez – piano (3)
Myron Walden – alto saxophone (2, 3, 11), bass clarinet (11)
Derrick Gardner – trumpet (2, 3)
Vincent Gardner – trombone (2, 3)
Terreon Gully – drums (2, 3)
Monte Croft – vibraphone (4), marimba (8)
String section arranged and conducted by Jon Cowherd (6, 8, 10)
Sarah Adams, Ronald Carbone, Crystal Garner – viola
Ellen Westerman (soloist on 8), Joe Kimura, Caryl Paisner, Mark Orrin Shuman – cello
Chris Potter – soprano saxophone (7)
Adam Rogers – acoustic, electric and bottleneck guitar (12)

Production
Tommy LiPuma, Brian Blade, Jon Cowherd - production
Joe Ferla - recording
Andrew Felluss, Chris Fama, David Perini, Jason Stasium - second engineers
Al Schmidt - mixing
Steve Genewick - mixing assistant
Doug Sax and Robert Hadley - mastering
Hollis King - art direction
Rika Ichiki - design
Bill Phelps - photography

References 

2003 albums
Lizz Wright albums
Albums produced by Tommy LiPuma
Verve Records albums